Passi, officially the City of Passi, is a 4th class component city in the province of Iloilo, Philippines. According to the 2020 census, it has a population of 88,873 people.

Its relatively flat land stretches alongside the Jalaur and Lamunan Rivers. Mountainous areas are found along the northern part of the city. Passi is a rice, pineapple, and sugar-rich area, its annual output in fruit production earning it the popular slogan "The Sweet City at The Heart of Panay". It is the Province of Iloilo's only component city, and its largest in terms of land area and income, and second after Oton in terms of population.

History
Passi is considered to be one of the oldest Spanish settlements in Iloilo. It was organized as a pueblo (community settlement of natives) in 1766 with Don Martin Saligumba as its first gobernadorcillo. It had been previously settled by three Malay brothers named Dig-on, Tokiab and Umawang.

Popular Legend 
According to popular legend, the name of Passi originated from a dialogue between Spanish conquistadors and an indigenous person. Conquistadors stumbled on a small hut by a riverbank where an old woman was winnowing pounded rice. One of them, not knowing the woman's native language, asked her where they were. Not knowing their language either, she assumed they were asking what was in her basket, and replied, "Ah, pasi," which meant "rice". From then on, the Spanish named the place Pasi, which later evolved into the current name of Passi. Such legends about name origins are common throughout towns and cities in the Philippines, the core plot being a Spaniard asking non-Spanish speaking natives for the name of their location, and using the native's response as the name.

It is said that the first Spanish settlement was established in the area in 1766.  In the traditional story, Spanish explorers anchored in Ansig, a place located at the mouth of Lamunan River. The founding of the present poblacion of Passi was attributed to Don Martin Saligumba.

Development and Later History 
In 1957, within Passi, the sitio of Agtabo in the barrio–that is, district–of Salngan became itself a barrio. In the same year, the barrio of Santa Rosa was renamed Santo Tomas.

Passi experienced development over this period. Because of its strategic location, Passi became a center for trade and commerce and brought more investment to the municipality. Its high income, significant population growth, and a considerable area of land gained it recognition as the first component city in the Island of Panay. On January 30, 1998, the then President of the Philippines, Fidel V. Ramos, signed R.A. 8469, officially converting Passi into a city.

Historical Notes About Passi
 Passi was the pre-war capital of Iloilo Province in January 1942 to April 16, 1942, until the landing of Japanese Occupation Force.
 Passi was made the quartermaster depot of United States Army Forces in the Far East (USAFFE) for the food of the army that resisted in Bataan through Capiz.
 The central school became the seat of the provincial government offices including the Agricultural and Industrial Bank and the Philippine National Bank before the Japanese landing in Panay.
 Passi has the first warehouse of the Compania General de Tabacos de Filipinas in Central Panay which lately became the Roman Catholic Church and also the warehouse of the USAFE for foodstuff for Corregidor and Bataan.
 Ibajay Cave and mountain northeast of the poblacion was the seat of the Municipal Resistance Government under Mayor Filoteo Palmares and Municipal Treasurer Pedro Oro during the war years.
 Passi Central Elementary School (now Passi I Central School) had the first clean ground in the province before the war.
 One of the first regional high schools established in Iloilo was in Passi soon after liberation and one of the first to have acquired the widest site for high school of 12 hectares. Its athletic field cut from a hill and bulldozed by Mayor Palmares, leveled, and improved in time for the most lavished Unit Athletic Meet ever held in the interior in 1949–1959.
 The record of Passi in holding the First Provincial Athletic Meet in the interior before the war and in sustaining all the athletic delegations from different towns in Iloilo most abundantly and freely of which some meat uneaten were only given to them gratis et amore and some heads of cattle (surplus) sold for athletic fund  ̶  still unbroken up to this day  ̶  a feat that has never been or will ever be equaled in the history of athletic meets of Iloilo.
 In matters of bestowing the old Filipino traditional customs of being hospitable to individual visitor, visiting teams and districts, Passi's record is yet unsurpassed because sumptuous foods and drinks offered by truckloads and caritos flow like water without reservation of any kind.
 Passi has the biggest cattle ranch in Panay before the war because of her wide grazing land.
 Passi therefore was the biggest supplier of meat for the army during the war and also the biggest supplier of rice and corn for sustenance of the guerilla forces and the Provincial Guards of the Civil Resistance Movement of Free Panay and Romblon Gov. Tomas Confesor.
 During Spanish regime, Passi was the home of wealthy families outside Iloilo City.
 Passi became the first component city of Iloilo in 1998.

Geography

The City of Passi is situated in the heart of Panay along the New Iloilo-Capiz Highway.

The City of Passi is adjacent to Dumarao in the north, San Rafael in the east, San Enrique in the southeast, Dueñas in the south, Calinog in the west and Bingawan in the northwest.

Climate

Passi, like most inland towns in Iloilo, has no pronounced maximum rain period and no distinct dry or wet seasons. Occasionally, it does experience typhoons; however, these are not events common to its area.

Rivers and Mountains
The city is traversed by 5 major rivers: the Jalaur, Lamunan, Hin-ayan, Asisig and Maliao.  It also has creeks and tributaries which can be tapped for irrigation purposes.

Geographically, it is relatively dominated by rolling hills and narrow valley plains. It is bordered by Mount Cañapasan and Mount Bayoso.

Barangays
Passi City is politically subdivided into 51 barangays (38 rural, 11 urban, and 2 city proper barangays), which are grouped into four geographical districts.

Barangays Poblacion Ilawod and Ilaya are the most urbanized of the barangays, composing the city proper area of Passi. The majority of the downtown area exists inside of Poblacion Ilawod. Dorillo Street divides the whole city proper area into two barangays; the western portion occupied by Poblacion Ilaya, and the eastern part occupied by Poblacion Ilawod. Barangay Poblacion Ilawod was the political center of Passi when it was a municipality; however, the new city hall and the government center were transferred to Barangay Sablogon when Passi was proclaimed as a city in 1998.

The City of Passi belongs to the 4th District of Iloilo.

Listed below are the respective population of each barangay as of the 2010 census.

Demographics

People native to Passi are known as Passinhons. Kinaray-a is the language most predominantly spoken in Passi, as well as in surrounding towns. People also speak Hiligaynon, Capiznon, Tagalog and English as second languages.

Language

Kinaray-a is the most dominant language spoken in Passi City. English is used as the language of business and education. In addition, other local dialects such as Hiligaynon, and languages such as Capiznon and Tagalog, are used. Some Spanish words are interspersed with Kinaray-a conversation, evident mostly among older generations and some wealthy families. Descendants of families related to sugar plantations also may use a mix of Spanish and Kinaray-a.

Religion
The Passinhon people are predominantly Roman Catholic. Protestantism is also practiced in the Philippine Independent Church or Aglipayan Church, as well as the Baptist, Presbyterian, Methodist, Adventist, and Evangelical Christian churches. Other religions or Christian sects include the Iglesia Ni Cristo, Church of Christ of Latter-Day Saints and Jehovah's Witnesses.

Economy

Agriculture 
The physical resources of Passi consists of relatively good soil types along rolling hills and narrow valley plains with substantial surface and ground water, with no distinct dry and wet season which is suitable for a wide range of agricultural products like rice, sugarcane, and pineapple. When the sugar industry experience a slump due to falling sugar prices and quotas in the world market, farmers diversified into other agricultural products like corn, pineapple, mongo, root crops, and other farm- based products. The city has investment potentials for Agri-Industrial developments.

Passi is a 4th class component city with this year's annual income of P300,860,719-General Income, P26,732,922-Special Educational Fund, P37,287,853-Trust Fund, with a total current operating income of P364,881,424 .

Passi City has played an important role in reaching its peak of progress. Centrally situated in the province, Passi City is locally important as the District Agri-Industrial Center of Iloilo with three sugar centrals. It is rich with agriculture resources that have long formed the backbone of its economy and agricultural diversification produces crops such as rice, corn, vegetables, coconut, sugarcane and pineapple. Passi City has been an important pineapple producer for years, it has long been known for other industries including fruit processing, wallboard production, metalworking production and cut-flower propagation. Its locally produced pineapple wine, jam and fruit preserves have already established captured market with its exposure to various local trade fairs and exhibits such as the annual Fiesta in the City celebration during May; TUMANDOK in September; and WOW Philippines: the Best of the Region.

Passi, a component city (R.A. No. 8469 by Pres. Fidel Valdez Ramos last January 30, 1998.) is bounded on the north by San Enrique; Dumarao, Capiz on the south; east by Calinog; and Lemery on the west. Predominantly a mountainous area, it is politically divided into 51 barangays. It is about 50 kilometers from the city of Iloilo, 70 kilometers from the city of Roxas and has an area of 25,139 hectares or 251.39 km2---the largest in the province.

Industrial development is one of the priority concerns of the local unit being one of the five Agro-Industrial district in the Province and the site for People's Industrial Enterprise (PIE's) District Agro-Industrial Center (PAIC) in the 4th District.  The PIE's / DAIC's provide intermediate processing of indigenous raw materials produced in their respective influence area for final processing at the DAIC.  They also manufacture finished goods cooperative advantage for such manufacturing activities would prove viable.

Attractions in the city include the wide pineapple plantations, the cock farms, the Baroque Church of Saint William the Hermit, the old Muscovado Chimney, the Chameleon Butterfly Garden, the Amorotic caves of Barangay Magdungao, the breath-taking highway view with good sunset and the old Railway Bridge which needs some preservation and attention spanning the Jalaur River.

Recently, CCTV cameras were installed along city proper roads, national highways, public market, large establishments, hospital, bus terminal, some political subdivision boundaries, and other strategic areas due to sudden increase in crimes this 2010 to 2011.

Banking
Passi City being the center of trade and business outside Metro Iloilo, several banking institutions are presently serving in the city and the surrounding municipalities.

Shopping
Being the component city of Iloilo Province, Passi serves as the major shopping destination outside the province's capital city.

Gaisano Capital Passi, so far is the first shopping mall in Passi. It has a complete line of grocery store and department store. It has also some leased spaces which are occupied by Rose Pharmacy, Ted's Lapaz Batchoy, Mister Donuts, Goldilocks Cake, Mang Inasal Restaurant, Parajan Deli Resto, Bongbong's Pasalubong, Robinsons Bank, Big Brother Party Needs, Western Union, Jed's Barbershop, Fuji Film Photo, F&C Jewelry, Nouva KTV and Amusement and other stalls.

CityMall (Philippines) Commercial Centers Inc. is now open and is located at the front of Passi City Bus Terminal at the Iloilo-Capiz New Route. It houses several retail stores and food chains. A lot of retail chain of stores had already invested in the city.

Power and Energy
Power distribution is facilitated by Iloilo Electric Cooperative II (ILECO II), to Passi City and neighboring towns such as Dueñas, San Enrique, and Calinog.

In August 2022, MORE Power, the power distributor that serves Iloilo City, was officially granted permission to expand in Passi City and sixteen other municipalities in the province.

Water Supply
Water distribution is facilitated by Balibago Waterworks System Inc. to Passi City proper and neighboring barangays.

Communications
Telephone services including domestic and international direct dial, mobile communications, internet, cable television, post offices and other services.

There are three telephone Service provider in Passi providing landline connections to almost several households, offices and establishments. These are: Philippine Long Distance Telephone Company, Globe Telecom and Panay Telephone Corporation (PANTELCO).

Cellular telephone facilities are also provided by two cellular companies namely Smart Communications, and Globe Telecom.

Television Stations
Kalibo Cable TV Inc. (Former Milkyway Cablevision Services, Inc. (MCSI)) provider of local cable TV to Passi, San Enrique, Duenas and Dingle. It offers 74 national and international television channels, plus one local channel (Milkyway Community Channel) showing local programming and talk shows. Talking Point is one of the major programs of this channel where a particular person or organization of an institution is interviewed regarding the particular matters or topics relevant to the City of Passi. It is also broadcast live in Facebook by the page Good Morning Passi.

Cignal HD TV is also available in the area for wireless, direct to satellite signal for watching local and international channels.

Local antenna can also receive signals of local channels like GMA7, Abs-Cbn, TV5 and PTV4.

Print media
The Passinhon Times is the official publication of the City of Passi.

Culture

Pintados de Passi

The Pintados de Pasi Festival, in Passi City, central of Iloilo province, is one way of celebrating the cityhood of Passi in March 1998. This festival is perhaps one of the best known and established festivals of the Visayan region that have evolved through the years. It has played a big part in the lives of most Passinhons. It is the most popular spectator cultural event and has a large community following. Theatrical-like street dancing performances are a celebrated part of the Pintados festivity that is characterized by heavy and aggressive body movements. Here, performers adorned in traditional body tattoo with elaborate geometrical designs in their body, including their arms, legs and torso dramatizes stories in which the towns’ ancestral beings laid down every feature of the area, especially, their way of life.

Characterized by heavy and aggressive body movements, the dances seem to have developed independent of any external influences, as in the combat dances, folk plays, ritual actions, or character types. Historical or cultural sources are essential materials in sustaining a festival such as theirs.

The first inhabitants of the Island called it Aninipay, after the name of the plant that was then abundant in the area. When the Malayans came, they named it Madia-as, which was the name of the highest peak in the Island.

But unknown to many, the first batch of Spaniards that reached the island gave a different name to it. They called it “Isla de Pintados” after seeing tattooed men whom they called pintados or “painted people.”
The art tattooing was practiced all throughout the island. The chronicler Miguel de Loarca, in his account in Historia Pre-Hispanica de Filipinas Sobre la Isla de Panay, described the practice.

Culturally, the inhabitants of Panay used tattoos to exhibit their record in battle. The more tattoo marks a man had on his body, the higher his status as a warrior. The elegance of the pintado practice has raised tattooing into the level of art. They do then with such order, symmetry, and coordination that they elicit admiration from those who see them.

While the men put tattoo all over their body, it was a rule in the old Panay society that women only wear tattoos on one side of their arms.

Christmas events

Christmas events are held in the city every middle of December until the first Sunday of January in the next year at Plaza Paloma. During its opening day it had a grand fireworks display, followed by the opening of lights, and food stalls. Trees and other structures in the plaza are designed with colorful lights. Lamp post are also illuminated with designs. Food stalls for children are also available like popcorn, cotton candy, and pancakes. Every night there are presentations held at the middle of the plaza by different institutions, sometimes including live music and entertainment.

Kapistahan

Passi City celebrates the feast of its patron saint, San Guillermo de Ermita (St. William the Hermit) on February 10 along with the coronation of the fiesta queen. Mostly the activities are already starting 1 week before. There will be street parades in the morning. Programs are held every night in the plaza sponsored by different institutions and there will be dancing afterwards. Carnivals and rides in the plaza are available for the public and small store kiosk are open to sell different items like clothing, jewelry, home designs, etc. It is one of the most anticipated festival in the city.

St. William the Hermit of Maleval Parish Church

This is considered a militaristic church in that it was planned as a ‘fortress church’ and the proof of this can be seen in the massive buttresses which support the front and back walls of the church.  The church was built to replace churches that had been destroyed by an earthquake in 1612 and subsequent churches that had been destroyed by fires.

In 1856 Friar Pedro Ceberio restored the church that had fallen into disrepair and what we see today is the result of his work.

As is usual in churches of this vintage that can immediately discern that it was built, once again, by the Augustinians since their seal appears in the archway over one of the side entrances. It is said that the historical record is vague on the topic of entrances that indicates that historians are not certain as to where the actual main entrance was placed by the original builders. It appears that it may well have been this doorway on the southeast corner of the church at the entrance of the ‘Garden of Saints’.

All was well with the church through the Revolution and the Philippines American War but in 1932 the roof was blown away by a typhoon.

The church is surrounded by a ‘Garden of the Saints’ which contains 25 to 30 statues of Saints that have been placed in the garden by parishioners over the years.

Inside the very tall belfry of the church are the three bells, two of which are massive ones and the other one is a small one. To ring the large one, they need to step on the chain that is attached to the bell's clapper to make it hit the sound rim. The harder it is stepped on it the louder would the sound be. The two other bells are rung manually.  They have to hold the two clappers together and hit them to the sound rim to make them work. This makes the bell ringer so close to the bells when ringing them.

Discovery and Foundation

The discovery of Passi, at the same time its foundation as a mission parish by the Spanish explorers for Panay Island occurred in 1584. It was placed under the patronage of St. William of Maleval whose feast had since then been celebrated every February 10. In 1593, Padre Juan Villamayor, an Augustinian friar, became its first resident priest.
The first mission church was made out of light materials and located near the riverbank of Jalaur River. In 1600 the church was transferred from the old site to its present location. The foundation and the walls were made of stones, slabs and lime. The parishioners were made to carry the needed materials every time they went to the church. The construction was finished during the time of Padre Pedro Ceberio when Salvador “Badong” Panes Perfecto was the Captain of the town.

 Schism and Abaca
Around 1821 during the time of Padre Apolinario Villanueva, Schism ensued between him as Parish Priest and the Spanish Populace of the town. He transferred the seat of the Parish Church to Abaca where he constructed a chapel. When Padre Martin succeeded him, the seat of the parish church was returned to Passi.

 Aglipayon Revolution
With the concurring Filipino Revolution against the Spanish government, there was a clamor of the Filipino Clergy for reforms. Padre Rafael Murillo, the Parish Priest then was a good follower and supporter of the Aglipay. He was elevated to the rank of an Aglipayan Bishop not long brought with him his family. To support his family, he demanded tributes from the people. The Passinhons under Captain Badong Perfecto strongly objected and Padre Joaquin was removed not long after.

Spanish Era to Post-War Years

Padre Lorenzo Diaz, a Catholic Augustinian Priest administered the Parish. The year 1891 saw the last Spanish Augustinian Parish Priest of Passi in Padre Bravo.

 Reverend Father Amado Panes Perfecto
In 1893, after three centuries of Christianization, Passi was able to produce its first priest, Padre Amado Panes Perfecto. He studied in the University of Salamanca in Spain and graduated a Doctor of Canon Law, which at that time was a rare privilege. He was appointed the first Filipino Priest of Passi. He constructed a convent furnished with carved furniture and imported chinaware and utensils. One of his remaining masterpieces is the “Flores de Mayo Salve” which has become part of the tradition of the town.

 World War II
World War II was conflagration for the Passinhons. Fire gluttered all the Spanish built houses of the town. The guerillas burned all the buildings leaving the town empty for the occupying Japanese. Nothing was left of the wooden structure of both church and convent but the stones. The church was made the garrison of the Japanese forces and later the headquarters of the Residence Civil Government. Filipino troops under the Philippine Commonwealth Army and Philippine Constabulary were liberated in Passi and help the local guerrilla groups by attacking Japanese troops and ended in World War II.

 Lady Caycay earthquake
The 1948 Lady Caycay earthquake occurred on January 25, 1948, at 1:46 AM UTC+08:00 in Panay Island, Philippines. The bell tower did not survive the harshness of the earthquake. The tall tower was wrecked; making the entire bells fell down to the ground. No damage was found except for the other massive bell, which had a very slight crack on it.

The Church from Then and Now

 Reconstruction
The reconstruction of the church took a gradual development. The wood and nipa roofing of the church was constructed during the time of Padre Parreñas. Wooden posts were placed at the Eastern side of the church as temporary area to place the bells, since the bell tower was damaged during the 1948 earthquake. When Padre Buenaflor took over, he had the roof changed into galvanized iron. The improvement of the altar which was transferred by Padre Parreñas to the main entrance of the church was done during the time of Padre Castaño. The present church with its steel trusses, washed walls, benches, and a new but permanent belfry, together with the old parish convent already demolished, the Assumption School and the former Social Hall, were all constructed as projects of Msgr. Eligio Villavert, the 81st Parish Priest of Passi.

 Final Restoration and Renovation
It was 1997 when the Parish of St. William of Maleval was graced with another Passinhon Priest. Msgr. Felipe Dativo Palomo, P.C., fully supported by the Parish Councils and the Passinhon Parishioners both local and abroad decided to venture into ambitious but necessary projects. In the year 2000, the completion and the blessing of the Jubilee Hall, the largest and tallest parish convent in the whole Diocese was witnessed.
After the completion, behind the church, the attention of the parishioners and Msgr. Palomo were directed to the uncompleted church. The main entrance is nowhere to be found, making Passi Church one of its kind. The landscaping of the Western side of the church and the installation of the statues of the saints took place.
The altar was transferred to its original place, to give way to the restoration of its original main entrance. The altar has been restored according to the Augustinian's original architectural design. The ornate granite flooring, echo-proof ceiling, decorative stained glasses, a huge steel door at the main entrance and modern lighting facilities were installed. On the Eastern side, one can see the Avenida de la Virgin Maria, the Adoration Chapel, parking area, and the very huge relief map of Passi City.

On October 26, 2010, the Church of St. William of Maleval had its Solemn Dedication, an annual festivity which the Parishioners will celebrate to continue recalling the extra graciousness God has abundantly bestowed in the Christian Community of Passi.

 Typhoon Yolanda
On November 8, 2013, signal number four Typhoon Yolanda (also known internationally as Typhoon Haiyan) hit the Visayas Region, causing serious damages to the infrastructure, including the church. The church, three years after it is restored was partially damaged. The ceiling outside the church and into the altar collapsed. The church was temporarily closed and masses are temporarily held at the Jubilee Hall. However, it was opened again to the public on December 16, 2013, after the massive reconstruction and repair.

Infrastructure and tourism

Passi City has several landmarks that symbolizes its rich history and culture over the years. The city is known for its natural environment and diversity, including its mountain ranges and caves. Its historical significance in the Second World War also contributed much in the history of Iloilo Province as well. It offers a lot of place to satisfy your stomach development. It has also places where you can spend your time leisurely or maybe just relax and take a rest.

Currently, a lot infrastructure developments are taking place in the city.

The bypass road which has 3 stages. The first is from Gines Viejo to Man it via Gemat y. The second from main hiway in Punong to main hiway in Sablogon via Batu, Man it, San Roque St, Sara Rd, and a new road to Sablogon. The third is from main hiway Sablogon to Arac and to Gines via Lamunan Bridge. The bridges are still undergoing construction and so are the roads. It is expected to be finish before February 2020. If finished travelers from different directions of Passi City can go directly to any directions they want without passing the city proper.

Passi City Esplanade is also undergoing construction. It will be from the old railway bridge to the bridge of the main hiway and it will be done on both banks of the river. It will be 5 meters wide, except on the location near the bridge on Citimall side where it will be wider and will put some amenities for recreational activities.

Places To See 

 F. Palmares Sr. Street
It is also known as the "Calle Real" of Passi since it was the busiest business hub of the city until now. This street is an old national highway when going to the Province of Capiz or Aklan. At present, it is used as an alternative national road going to Iloilo Airport.

 The New City Hall of Passi City
Built in 1995 as a new municipal hall, but in 1998, it is redesigned to become the new city hall. It is located at Corner Monfort Avenue-Casamayor Street.

 The Old Municipal Hall
The municipal hall was built in 1930 and it is one of the only surviving Pre-war infrastructures in Passi. Presently, it houses the office of the Department of Agrarian Reform (DAR), Commission on Elections (COMELEC), Post Office, and Conference Hall. The old municipal hall is sometimes known as "Residencia Passi".

 St. William of Maleval Parish Church Convent
The largest and tallest parish convent in the whole Archdiocese has two reception halls (Jubilee Hall and Lamunan Hall) that can be used in various occasions such as wedding reception.

 Plaza Paloma
Located just in front of the old municipal hall. The large pineapple restroom is one of the most attractive feature of the said park. The park also has a multipurpose sporting court for the people who want to do recreational activities such as playing badminton, tennis and others.

 Paseo de Passi
Just few meters away from plaza paloma, is a brick floored paseo that is a perfect place for people who are fond of doing fitness exercises.

 Passi City Public Market
The new public market of Passi is the largest in the whole Iloilo Province.

 Old Jalaur Railway Bridge
Also known as Watanabe Terror Bridge, it is one of the fewest railroad bridges left in the whole Panay. It is one of the major landmarks of Passi that needs further preservation.

 Muscovado Chimney
The muscovado chimney of Passi Sugar Central is the largest and tallest in the whole Panay island.

Healthcare
The City of Passi in its goal to have a healthy environment and thereby realized a healthy community has intensified its health and social programs and activities. Consequently, it has improved the health situation and public services of the entire populace through government services and non-government organizations.

Don Valerio Palmares Sr. Memorial District Hospital
The only province-managed district hospital in Passi City.

Salngan Rural Hospital
In October 2013, the inauguration of the extension hospital in Barangay Salngan took place. The hospital will help residents who live very far away from the city proper in giving necessary medical attentions and first aid.

Other Private Health Institutions
Medicus Passi
Fronthub Medilab and Clinics
and other privately owned clinics which also offer high quality health services.

Philippine Red Cross
Passi City is the new Regional Operations Center of the Philippine Red Cross as well as its new logistics and disaster management training center. The center was inaugurated on April 21, 2017, by several officials of the PRC led by PRC Chairman Richard Gordon as well as the Secretary General of Korea National Red Cross Gunn-Joong Kim and the Head of Delegation of the International Federation of Red Cross and Red Crescent Societies Kari Isomaa in the presence of Arthur D. Defensor Sr., Governor of the Province of Iloilo; Jesry Palmares, Mayor of Passi City; Ferjenel Biron, Representative of the 4th District Iloilo; and Marlyn Convocar, Department of Health Regional Director.

Chameleon Association, Inc.
Founded in 1997 by French national Laurence Ligier, Chameleon Association, Inc (CAI), is a non- stock, non-profit and non-government organization that provides holistic and comprehensive rehabilitation to girls survivors of sexual abuse in Western Visayas. Likewise, CAI provides educational assistance to underprivileged but deserving children in our neighboring communities in Passi, San Enrique and Bingawan through its Sponsorship Program. The said organization is located in Barangay Sablogon, Passi City.

The Chameleon Association has branches in Paris, Luxembourg, and Switzerland and contacts in Belgium and Andorra.

Chameleon aims to give children and their families access to education and training; and support medically, morally, legally, and financially so as to help them have honorable and successful living conditions in the long-term. The association has also put in place a prevention program for the protection and training to reintegrate these children back into society and give them an everlasting survival strategy.

The Chameleon Association has an integrated approach and multiple programs to support and protect the children from the region. Their rehabilitation program handles young girls who are victims of sexual abuse in two stages: a three-year residential program and a post-residential program for rehabilitation. The community development program supports the studies of children who are victims of great poverty. This organization has also implemented programs for health, the defense of Children's rights, and income-generating projects.

The Chameleon Association creates long lasting relationships between the children and their sponsors through the exchange of letters, drawings, photographs, report cards, and small gifts.

Chameleon gives back to these children part of their innocence and helps them to fulfill their dreams of going to school and having a future.

Sports
Passi City athletic field was currently under construction beside Passi City College at Barangay Bacuranan. It is expected to be finished by 2020. It is going to be huge with state of the art facilities, capable to host provincial and regional sports meet.

Passi City Gymnasium opened last May 2018. UAAP and PBA teams had already played here for exhibition games.

Passi City Center Fitness and Wellness located at Barangay Sablogon is a gym and fitness center. Passi City Center is also a location for cockfights events.

Every summer they held the Mayor Jesry T Palmares Summer Olympics which started on the year 2014. Sports played are basketball, volleyball, table tennis, lawn tennis, badminton, taekwondo, soccer, chess and fun run.

Education

College
Passi City College - courses offered

Diploma
Passi Trade School (Tesda)

Primary and secondary education
The area is also home to several high schools, elementary and prep schools, as well as several kinder schools.

Transportation

The city can be reached by bus, although some people can take it by taxi from Iloilo City. Tricycle and jeepney are the major means of transportation within Passi.

 Plane
From Manila, one can take direct flights to Iloilo.  Flying time approximately takes 45 minutes. From Cebu, Iloilo is even nearer—a mere 30 minutes away. From the Iloilo International Airport you can either take a taxi or rent a van and go directly to Passi City or you can go to Bus Terminals in Jaro, Iloilo for a bus ride.

 Boat, Ship
One can also take the longer but infinitely more exciting ferry trips from the North Harbor in Manila aboard a ship. A ferry trip to Iloilo City usually takes 24 hours to reach Iloilo Seaport. One can take a cab to the bus terminal located at Jaro, Iloilo City and get on a bus to Passi City.  If from Bacolod, you can take a fastcraft to Iloilo port. The trip usually takes 45 minutes. Then take a cab to the bus terminal located at Jaro, Iloilo City.

 Roro
Passi City can also be reached from Manila for 18 hours or more via the New Iloilo-Capiz Highway on a RORO Bus. You take the bus going to Iloilo and ask if it will pass Passi City, because others Roro bus take a different route when going to Iloilo City.

 Bus
Passi City can be reached by riding a Ceres Bus (either a regular one or air-conditioned) from Ceres Terminal in Jaro, Iloilo City with destination label such as Kalibo, Roxas, Caticlan, and Passi. If from Roxas City, Kalibo and Caticlan, you can ride Ceres Bus with label Iloilo. These buses always take a stopover at the Bus Terminal Complex at Passi City. CIBLA (Central Iloilo Bus Line Association) Busses are also available, and usually their destination labels are Passi, they are parked at tagbak Terminal in Jaro, Iloilo City.

 Taxi
There is no taxis within Passi City , but Taxi'd travelling around Iloilo City hired in going to Passi City.

 Jeepney
Neighboring towns such as Calinog and San Rafael have regular Public Utility Jeepney (PUJ) ride to reach Passi. Several barangays in Passi City make use of jeepney as their mode of transportation.

 Tricycle
 Passi City , its barangays ,towns of San Enrique and Dueñas are using tricycle in travelling in and out of Passi. A typical tricycle has an open front, four seaters, back passengers facing backwards and the front ones faces in front. . Majority has a route within city proper or what they called roving tricycles and they are colored yellow. Color coding are assigned to each barangay tricycles for distinction.

Notable personalities

 Jose S. Palma - The present Archbishop of Cebu and President of Catholic Bishops' Conference of the Philippines
 Aby Marano- Philippine Women's National Volleyball Team Captain

References

External links

 [ Philippine Standard Geographic Code]
 Philippine Census Information
 Local Governance Performance Management System

Cities in Iloilo
Populated places established in 1766
1766 establishments in the Philippines
Component cities in the Philippines